The Lion of Cithaeron was a lion in Greek mythology which was harassing the lands of king Amphitryon and king Thespius or of king Megareus. According to the Suda, it was also called Thespian lion and ravine lion (Charadraios leōn) because it lived in a place called "Ravine" (χαράδρα, charadra).
Some myths say that it was killed by Herakles, while others by Alcathous or by the god Apollo.

Heracles

One account of the myth has it that king Thespius asked Heracles to kill the lion. Heracles hunted it for fifty days and finally killed it. During each night of the hunt, Heracles slept with a different daughter of the king; they each gave birth to a son. After he slew the animal, Heracles dressed himself in the skin of the animal and wore the scalp as a helmet. According to the Suda, it was killed near Thespiae. Heracles killed the lion while he was eighteen years old, and before killing the Nemean lion.

Alcathous

Another account of the myth has it that the lion was killed by Alcathous. The lion had killed many including Euippus, a son of the king of Megara Megareus. The king promised that he who would kill the Cithaeronian lion would marry his daughter Evaechme  and succeed him in the throne. Alcathous killed the lion and when he became the king, he built the sanctuary of Artemis Agrotera (Huntress) and Apollo Agraeus (Hunter).

Apollo

Another account of the myth has it that the lion was killed by the god Apollo. Because the god killed the lion, he was called Agraeus (Hunter) and Alcathous erected a temple for him at Megara under the name of Apollo Agraeus.

See also 
 Kangla Sha
 Nongshaba

References 

Heracles
Monsters in Greek mythology
Mythology of Heracles
Mythological lions